Pat Donnellan (born 1941 in Dunmore, County Galway) is an Irish former sportsperson.  He played Gaelic football with his local club Dunmore McHales and was a member of the Galway senior inter-county team from 1960 until 1967.

Donnellan is a member of a famous football dynasty from Galway.  His father, Michael Donnellan, won an All-Ireland medal with Galway in 1925.  Donnellan's brother, John, captained Galway to the All-Ireland title in 1964.  His nephew, Michael Donnellan, won All-Ireland medals with Galway in 1998 and 2001.

See also
 Domnallan mac Maelbrigdi, from whom the surname Donnellan derives.

References

1941 births
Living people
Dunmore McHales Gaelic footballers
Galway inter-county Gaelic footballers
Connacht inter-provincial Gaelic footballers